Declared monuments of Hong Kong are places, structures or buildings legally declared to receive the highest level of protection. In Hong Kong, declaring a monument requires consulting the Antiquities Advisory Board, the approval of the Chief Executive of Hong Kong as well as the publication of the notice on the Hong Kong Government Gazette.

As of February 2013, there were 101 declared monuments, of which 57 were owned by the Government and the remaining 44 by private bodies. As of 10 March 2022, there were 132 declared monuments in Hong Kong, with 56 listed on Hong Kong Island, 53 on New Territories, 14 on Kowloon, and 9 on the Outlying Islands. Under Antiquities and Monuments Ordinance, some other buildings are classified as Grades I, II and III historic buildings, and are not listed below.

Monument declaration and historic buildings grading system 

There was no direct link between graded buildings and monuments. As of July 2007, 607 buildings had been graded (since 1980), 54 of these, including five Grade I buildings, had been demolished. As of August 2007, of 151 buildings classified as Grade I, only 28 pre-war buildings have been declared monuments since 1980.

On 26 November 2008, the Antiquities Advisory Board announced that the declaration of monuments would be related to the grading of historic buildings.

Proposed monuments
The Antiquities Authority (the Secretary for Development) may declare a building facing a demolition risk a proposed monument, thus providing the building with immediate protection against demolition. A Declaration of "proposed" status is valid for twelve months and may be extended. However the affected owner may object to the "proposed" status. Five buildings were declared proposed monuments between 1982 and 2012: Ohel Leah Synagogue (later Grade I in 1990), Morrison Building (subsequently declared in 2004), Jessville (later Grade III), King Yin Lei (subsequently declared in 2008) and Ho Tung Gardens (later demolished in 2013). Hung Lau was declared a proposed monument on 9 March 2017, and subsequently retained its Grade I status.

Monuments

Hong Kong Island

|}

Kowloon

 

|}

New Territories

 

|}

Outlying Islands

|}

See also
 List of buildings and structures in Hong Kong
 List of Grade I historic buildings in Hong Kong
 List of Grade II historic buildings in Hong Kong
 List of Grade III historic buildings in Hong Kong
 Heritage Trails in Hong Kong
 History of Hong Kong

References

External links 

 Declared Monuments in Hong Kong on the Antiquities and Monuments Office website 
 Google Map with all locations

 
Declared monuments